Aleksey Shchigolev (born 18 September 1972) is a retired Russian footballer who played as defender.

Career 
Shchigolev played for FC Tom Tomsk in the Russian First Division during the 2001 season, and Metallurg-Kuzbass in the Russian First Division during the 2003 season.

He also joined many foreign clubs in various countries. He played for Jeju United of the South Korean K-League, then known as Bucheon Yukong. He also played Beitar Tel Aviv and Maccabi Herzliya in the Israeli Premier League. He finished his career last season with FC Dinamo Brest in Belarus.

References

External links 
 
 

1972 births
Living people
Russian footballers
FC Torpedo Moscow players
FC Torpedo-2 players
FC Shinnik Yaroslavl players
FC Seoul players
Beitar Tel Aviv F.C. players
Jeju United FC players
FC Elista players
FC Tom Tomsk players
Maccabi Herzliya F.C. players
FC Dynamo Brest players
FC Novokuznetsk players
FC FShM Torpedo Moscow players
Russian expatriate footballers
Israeli Premier League players
Liga Leumit players
Russian Premier League players
K League 1 players
Expatriate footballers in South Korea
Expatriate footballers in Israel
Expatriate footballers in Belarus
Russian expatriate sportspeople in South Korea
Russian expatriate sportspeople in Israel
Russian expatriate sportspeople in Belarus
Association football defenders